The Yampol uezd was one of the uezds (uyezds or subdivisions) of the Podolia Governorate of the Russian Empire. It was situated in the central part of the governorate. Its administrative centre was Yampil (Yampol).

Demographics
At the time of the Russian Empire Census of 1897, Yampolsky Uyezd had a population of 266,300. Of these, 85.7% spoke Ukrainian, 10.4% Yiddish, 1.9% Russian, 1.8% Polish and 0.2% German as their native language.

References

 
Uezds of Podolia Governorate